The Lucy F. Simms School is a school building at 620 Simms Avenue in Harrisonburg, Virginia. It was listed on the National Register of Historic Places on February 11, 2004.
Lucy F. Simms (born 1855, died July 10, 1934) was a former slave who went on to become an influential teacher in Harrisonburg. 

The school was located in north-eastern Harrisonburg, on the site of a previous school, the Effinger Street school. It was co-educational but was only available to African American children. The site had housed a school from around 1880 on what had previously been the Hilltop estate of the Gray family. The Lucy F. Simms school was built in 1938 and closed from 1966 when American schools finally became integrated and so open to all children.

After the school's closure, the building remained empty until it was re-opened in 2005 as the Lucy F. Simms Continuing Education Center.

References

External links
http://www.heritagecenter.com/Web_Pages/Museum/Collection/blackedu/lucysims.html 
Lucy Simms oral history : background paper and transcripts Getachew, Wondwossen 2000

School buildings on the National Register of Historic Places in Virginia
School buildings completed in 1939
Schools in Virginia
National Register of Historic Places in Harrisonburg, Virginia